Zinaida Vasiliyevna Doynikova (12 September 1934 – March 2011) was a Soviet shot putter. She placed fourth and fifth at the 1956 and 1960 Summer Olympics, respectively.

References

1934 births
2011 deaths
Athletes (track and field) at the 1956 Summer Olympics
Athletes (track and field) at the 1960 Summer Olympics
Soviet female shot putters
Olympic athletes of the Soviet Union